Events from the year 1991 in Finland

Events 
17 March - 1991 Finnish parliamentary election
18 April - The first of the Hausjärvi Gravel Pit Murders is discovered.
20 October - 1991 Ålandic legislative election

Establishments 
12 "Wilderness Areas" are established in Lapland:
Hammastunturi Wilderness Area
Kaldoaivi Wilderness Area
Käsivarsi Wilderness Area
Kemihaara Wilderness Area
Muotkatunturi Wilderness Area
Paistunturi Wilderness Area
Pöyrisjärvi Wilderness Area
Pulju Wilderness Area
Tarvantovaara Wilderness Area
Tsarmitunturi Wilderness Area
Tuntsa Wilderness Area
Vätsäri Wilderness Area

Culture
 Finland in the Eurovision Song Contest 1991
 List of number-one singles of 1991 (Finland)

Sports 
Finnish people were in
 1991 World Amateur Boxing Championships
 1991 Men's European Volleyball Championship
 1991 European Figure Skating Championships

Births 
3 June - Sami Vatanen, ice hockey defenceman

Deaths
12 March – Ragnar Granit, neuroscientist and recipient of the Nobel Prize in Physiology or Medicine (born 1900)
30 August - Joel Pekuri, diplomat (born 1927)

References 

 
1990s in Finland
Finland
Finland
Years of the 20th century in Finland